Westfield High School may refer to:

 The Westfield School, Perry, Georgia
 Westfield High School (Westfield, Indiana)
 Westfield High School (Massachusetts), Westfield, Massachusetts
 Westfield Technical Academy, Westfield, Massachusetts
 Westfield High School (New Jersey)

 Westfield High School (Harris County, Texas)
 Westfield High School (Virginia)

 Westfields Sports High School, Sydney, Australia

See also
 Westfield School (disambiguation)
 Westfield Schools (disambiguation)